State Road 527 (NM 527) is a  state highway in the US state of New Mexico. NM 527's western terminus is at the end of Route at Simms Mesa Campground, and the eastern terminus is at U.S. Route 64 (US 64) east of Blanco.

Major intersections

See also

References

527
Transportation in Rio Arriba County, New Mexico